Anthony Petrie (born 3 June 1983) is an Australian basketball coach and former professional basketball player. He played 11 seasons in the National Basketball League (NBL) between 2007 and 2018. He is currently the head coach of the Gold Coast Rollers in the NBL1 North.

Early life
Petrie was born in Tenterfield, New South Wales. Alongside basketball, he grew up playing cricket, rugby league and athletics.

Playing career

NBL
Petrie made his debut in the National Basketball League (NBL) for the West Sydney Razorbacks during the 2007–08 season. For the 2008–09 NBL season, he joined the Wollongong Hawks.

Between 2009 and 2012, Petrie played for the Gold Coast Blaze. For the 2009–10 season, he named the NBL's Most Improved Player and earned All-NBL Second Team honours after averaging 11.3 points and 6.6 rebounds per game. Three games into the 2010–11 season, he suffered a season-ending Achilles tendon rupture.

Between 2012 and 2016, Petrie played for the Adelaide 36ers. He helped the 36ers reach the 2014 NBL Grand Final series, where they lost 2–1 to the Perth Wildcats.

Between 2016 and 2018, Petrie played for the Brisbane Bullets. On 31 December 2016, he was ruled out of the rest of the 2016–17 NBL season with a left knee injury. He damaged the same knee again during the 2017–18 season and subsequently had one last knee operation in November 2017 to see him through the season. He retired from the NBL in February 2018.

State Leagues
Petrie debuted in the South East Australian Basketball League (SEABL) in 2003 with the Canberra Gunners, helping the team win the East Conference title. He played four more seasons with the Gunners between 2005 and 2008. In 2006 and 2007, he was the SEABL East MVP, and was a three-time All-SEABL East Team honouree.

In 2010, Petrie played for the Northside Wizards of the Queensland Basketball League (QBL). In 2012, he had a one-game stint in the SEABL with the Brisbane Spartans, and in 2013 he played for the North Adelaide Rockets in the Central ABL.

In 2019, Petrie played for the Gold Coast Rollers in the QBL. He returned to the Rollers in 2021, now playing in the rebranded NBL1 North.

National team
Petrie first played for Australia in the 2002 Oceania Under 22 Championships, leading the team in scoring. His first Australian Boomers call-up came just shy of his 30th birthday, with Petrie playing against China in the 2013 Sino-Australia Challenge. This led to selection in the Boomers team for the 2013 FIBA Oceania Championship.

Coaching career
In December 2021, Petrie was appointed head coach of the Gold Coast Rollers for the 2022 NBL1 North season. He guided the team to the championship.

Personal life
Petrie and his wife Sarah have four children. Sarah (née Berry) is a former Canberra Capitals championship player.

Petrie completed his Bachelor of Education degree at ACU's Canberra Campus.

References

External links
Brisbane Bullets player profile
NBL stats

1983 births
Living people
Adelaide 36ers players
Australian men's basketball players
Brisbane Bullets players
Gold Coast Blaze players
Power forwards (basketball)
West Sydney Razorbacks players
Wollongong Hawks players